Mathew "Mat" Pitsch (born ) is an American politician who most recently served as a member of the Arkansas Senate from the 8th district. Elected in November 2018, he was in office from January 14, 2019 to January 9, 2023. Pitsch was a member of the Arkansas House of Representatives from 2015 to 2019.

Early life and education 
Pitsch was born in Buffalo, Wyoming and raised in Fort Smith, Arkansas. He earned Bachelor of Science and Master of Science degrees in engineering management from the Missouri University of Science and Technology. The university honored Pitsch in 2005, including him among the first inductees into its Academy of Engineering Management.

Career 
Prior to entering politics, Pitsch worked as the executive director of Western Arkansas Intermodal Authority and dean of the College of Applied Science and Technology at the University of Arkansas–Fort Smith. He was elected to the Arkansas Senate in November 2018 and assumed office on January 14, 2019.

In February 2021, Pitsch declared his candidacy for treasurer of Arkansas in the 2022 election. He was endorsed by incumbent treasurer Dennis Milligan.  In the Republican primary, Pitsch lost the nomination nearly 3:1 to Arkansas House representative Mark Lowery.

References 

1960s births
Republican Party Arkansas state senators
Living people
Missouri University of Science and Technology alumni
People from Buffalo, Wyoming
People from Fort Smith, Arkansas
University of Arkansas–Fort Smith people